Paasa Paravaigal is a 1988 Indian Tamil-language drama film directed by Cochin Haneefa and written by M. Karunanidhi, with music by Ilaiyaraaja. The film stars Sivakumar, Lakshmi, Mohan and Raadhika. It is a remake of Haneefa's own 1986 Malayalam film Moonnu Masangalku Mumbu. The film was released on 29 April 1988 and became a commercial success. It won the Tamil Nadu State Film Award for Second Best Film, and Raadhika won the Best Actress at Cinema Express Awards.

Plot 

Mohan will be killed. The Blame will be on Sivakumar. His Sister Radhika will file a case on Sivakumar. In the end it would be discovered that Cochin Haneefa killed Mohan and to revenge him Sivakumar would have killed Cochin Haneefa

Cast 
 Sivakumar as Sukumar
 Lakshmi as Anandhi
 Mohan as Shankar
 Raadhika as Uma
 Cochin Haneefa as Dhandraj
 Ravichandran as Thirugnanam
 Nassar as Dr. Sekar
 Thyagu as Ramu
 Oru Viral Krishna Rao (cameo appearance)
 S. S. Chandran as Dr. Yaman
 Delhi Ganesh as Public Prosecutor
 Gandhimathi as Vaigai
 Charu Haasan as Chief Doctor
 Master Tingu as Sukumar's son
 Gokila as Rohini, Shankar's ex-fiancé/Dhandraj's cousin

Production 
Paasa Paravaigal is a remake of Haneefa's own 1986 Malayalam film Moonnu Masangalku Mumbu. Mohan dubbed in his own voice for the first time in a Tamil film.

Soundtrack 
The music was by Ilaiyaraaja and lyrics were written by Gangai Amaran.

Release and reception 
Paasa Paravaigal was released on 29 April 1988. N. Krishnaswamy of The Indian Express wrote, "As long as the film dwells on the nuances in the relationships of its lead characters [...] it sails smoothly and with an assurance that signals bon voyage." The film was a commercial success running for over 100 days in theatres. It won the Tamil Nadu State Film Award for Second Best Film, and Raadhika won the Cinema Express Award for Best Actress – Tamil.

References

External links 
 

1980s Tamil-language films
1988 films
Films about brothers
Films about siblings
Films about sisters
Films directed by Cochin Haneefa
Films scored by Ilaiyaraaja
Films shot in Chennai
Films with screenplays by M. Karunanidhi
Indian courtroom films
Indian drama films
Tamil remakes of Malayalam films